Anolis duellmani, also known commonly as Duellman's anole, Duellman's pygmy anole, and el abanaquillo de Duellman in Mexican Spanish, is a species of lizard in the family Dactyloidae. The species is endemic to Mexico.

Etymology
The specific name, duellmani, is in honor of American herpetologist William Edward Duellman.

Geographic range
A. duellmani is found in the Mexican state of Veracruz.

Habitat
The preferred natural habitat of A. duellmani is forest.

Description
A. duellmani is very small for its genus. The tail is about one and two thirds SVL.

Reproduction
A. duellmani is oviparous.

Taxonomy
A. duellmani belongs to the Anolis auratus species group.

References

Further reading
Fitch HS, Henderson RW (1973). "A New Anole (Reptilia: Iguanidae) from Southern Veracruz, Mexico". Journal of Herpetology 7 (2): 125–128. (Anolis duellmani, new species).
Pavon-Vazquez CJ, Solano-Zavaleta I, Gray LN (2014). "Morphological variation and natural history of Anolis duellmani (Squamata: Dactyloidae)". Mesoamerican Herpetology 1 (1): 146–153.

Anoles
Reptiles described in 1973
Endemic reptiles of Mexico